Turla may refer to:

 Dniester (Turkish: Turla), a river
 Turla (group), a hacking group
 Turla (malware), a spyware package from the group